Jacques Mazoin (1929 – 11 July 2020) was a French rugby union player and coach.

Biography
Born in 1929, Mazoin played for US Dax during his youth career. He won the Coupe Frantz-Reichel championship in 1949.

He studied at the École normale d'éducation physique before playing with Paris Université Club from 1952 to 1954. He returned to US Dax to play professionally before retiring. He started working as a physical education teacher at the Lycée Borda in Dax.

Mazoin continued to work for the US Dax organization, working as a physical trainer from 1964 to 1973 before becoming head coach. He left his coaching position in 1977.

Jacques Mazoin died on 11 July 2020 at the age of 91.

References

French rugby union players
1929 births
2020 deaths